Dan Meis, FAIA, RIBA (born 1961) is an American architect best known for designing sports and entertainment facilities including Staples Center, Safeco Field, Paul Brown Stadium Stadio Della Roma, and Everton FC's new Everton Stadium. He began his career in Chicago under the mentorship of well-known architect Helmut Jahn, and later included time at sports architecture firms, including co-founding the sports and entertainment practice of NBBJ. Meis currently operates his own independent studio established in 2007, MEIS Architects, with offices in New York City and Los Angeles, California.

Meis has developed a reputation for out-of-the-box, innovative thinking through creating projects that redefine their respective building types. His design for AS Roma's Stadio Della Roma, is among the world's most state-of-the-art football stadium designs and includes one of international football's most tightly organized seating bowls. The ultra-modern, steel and glass stadium is wrapped in a floating stone “scrim”, which is intended to evoke Rome's most iconic landmark, the Colosseum. Everton FC's new stadium, which will replace the historic Goodison Park, home to the team since 1892, will be located at Bramley-Moore Dock, a UNESCO world heritage site on the banks of the River Mersey. Currently under construction, the new MEIS designed MLS stadium for FC Cincinnati, located in Cincinnati's West End neighborhood, will have an estimated seating capacity of 26,000 to 26,500, making it one of the largest soccer-specific stadiums in North America.

His firm has recently formed a partnership with Maria Sharapova, to build tennis, fitness, and wellness centers. MEIS is also working with entertainment giant, Live Nation, to design venue upgrades across a portfolio of outdoor amphitheaters.

While at Ellerbe Becket in the 1990s, Meis designed Europe's largest indoor arena, the Nynex Arena (now Manchester Arena) in Manchester, England, and led the design competition that won the $750 million Saitama Super Arena in Japan. Meis then left Ellerbe Becket to join established Seattle practice NBBJ, establishing NBBJ's sports division with Michael Hallmark and Ron Turner. Meis designed the Staples Center in Los Angeles, the Dodge Theater (now Comerica Theatre) in Phoenix, Miller Park in Milwaukee, Safeco Field in Seattle, Lincoln Financial Field in Philadelphia, and Paul Brown Stadium in Cincinnati, which was the first NFL facility to win an AIA design award. Meis' design for Los Angeles' Staples Center has been heralded as the "greatest arena ever built", and in 2001 he appeared in Time magazine as one of their "100 Innovators in the World of Sports". Meis' work has twice been awarded the prestigious Business Week/Architectural Record Award and he is the only architect twice recognized as one of Sports Business Journal's "40 under 40 Most Influential Sports Executives".

Meis' work has been featured in numerous publications including Architectural Record, Metropolis, Architectural Digest, Sports Illustrated, Business Insider, Bloomberg, Wired magazine, Los Angeles Times, I.D., L.A. Architect, Stadium & Arena Management and SPACE magazine, and he is a frequent lecturer at architectural schools across the world. In 2007, Meis was elevated to the College of the Fellows of the American Institute of Architects. Meis' ability to re-imagine typical ideas of what a building can be was highlighted in a November 2015 Sports Illustrated and Wired Super Bowl 100 Series feature on “The Future of Stadium Design”.

Education
Meis studied environmental design and engineering at the University of Colorado in Boulder, and later received a Bachelor of Architecture from the University of Illinois at Chicago.

Beginning in 2011, Meis served as an Adjunct Professor for Stadium Design at the University of Southern California.

Sample sports projects designed by Meis

Everton FC's Bramley-Moore Dock Stadium 
FC Cincinnati Stadium
Stadio Della Roma
Staples Center Suite Upgrades
Paul Brown Stadium Enhancements
StubHub Center Enhancements
Clippers Courtside Club
proposed Los Angeles NFL Stadium
Sports City Stadium 
Staples Center 
Santa Anita Park
USTA National Tennis Center 
Miller Park 
Paul Brown Stadium 
Safeco Field 
Saitama Super Arena 
Lincoln Financial Field 
Mazda Stadium 
Dodger Stadium Renovation
LA Coliseum Renovation
Sacramento Entertainment & Sports Center
Madison Square Garden Renovations
Columbus Crew Stadium
Qwest Convention Center and Arena
The Dodge Theater
RFK Stadium Renovation
Washington DC NFL Stadium 
The Meadowlands Renovation 
Dalian Soccer Stadium 
@Bahrain Master Plan and Auto Club 
Thunderbay Motor Speedway
Qualcomm Stadium Renovation
Beijing Olympic Master Plan 
Asia World Exhibition Center 
LG Twins Seoul Dome 
Guangdong Olympic Stadium 
Dalian Sports Center 
Cintas Center at Xavier University 
Al McGuire Center at Marquette University
University of Nevada-Las Vegas Thomas & Mack Center

Sample commercial projects designed by Meis

LA Clippers Corporate Headquarters
Kun Ming Towers
China Air Headquarters
Peterson Automotive Museum 
DTS World Headquarters
Herald Square
One Chase Manhattan
Doha Towers
Santa Clara HERO Site
Shenbei Live! Entertainment District
Doha Al Jassim Hotel
Pelican Lakes
Pizzeria Mozza
The Garage

References

Leibowitz, Edward (Spring 2012). "The Man with the Tatlin's Tower Tattoo". UIC Alumni Magazine. (referencing Tatlin's Tower)

External links
 MEIS Architects and Dan Meis, FAIA official web site

1961 births
Architects from Colorado
Living people
People from Windsor, Colorado
University of Colorado Boulder alumni
University of Illinois Chicago alumni
University of Southern California faculty
Sports venue architects